Joseph Bentley may refer to:

 Joseph T. Bentley (1906–1993), general superintendent of the Young Men's Mutual Improvement Association of the LDS Church
 Joseph Clayton Bentley (1809–1851), English line-engraver and painter